Desolation is a 2017 American horror thriller drama film written by Matt Anderson and Michael Larson-Kangas, directed by Sam Patton and starring Jaimi Page, Alyshia Ocshe and Toby Nichols.  It is Patton's feature directorial debut.

Cast
Toby Nichols as Sam
Jaimi Paige as Abby
Alyshia Ochse as Jen
Claude Duhamel as Hiker

Release
The film was released on December 15, 2017.

Reception
The film has a 58% rating on Rotten Tomatoes based on twelve reviews.

Frank Scheck of The Hollywood Reporter gave the film a negative review, describing it as "Too subtle for its own good."

Jeannette Catsoulis of The New York Times gave the film a positive review, describing it as "notable mainly for the beautifully organic performances of its two female leads."

Ben Pearson of /Film rated the film a 6 out of 10 and wrote, "Anyone looking for a pared down, character-driven survival story won't be disappointed with Desolation."

Noel Murray of the Los Angeles Times gave the film a negative review, describing it as "honorable in intent, but dreary in execution."

References

External links